Laxey completed the 'Grand Slam' of Manx football this season by winning the league championship, FA Cup, Railway Cup and Hospital Cup.

The Manx National team won the FA National League System Cup, allowing them to compete in the 2007 UEFA Regions' Cup.

League tables

Division 1

Division 2

Cups

FA Cup

Laxey   5–0    Pulrose United

Railway Cup
Laxey   1–0    St Georges

Charity Shield
Laxey   3–1    St Georges

Hospital Cup
Laxey   1–0    St Georges

Woods Cup
Union Mills   3–1    Colby

Paul Henry Gold Cup
Colby   0–4    Union Mills

Junior Cup
Laxey   6–3    Peel

Cowell Cup (U19)
St Georges   bt    Douglas HS Old Boys

References 

Isle of Man Football League seasons
Man
Foot
Foot